This is a list of characters from the BBC sitcom Only Fools and Horses, its spin-off series The Green Green Grass, and its prequel series Rock & Chips.

Overview

Family tree

Regular characters

Recurring characters

Major

Minor

PC Terry Hoskins
Police Constable Terence "Terry" Hoskins (Christopher Mitchell) appeared in two episodes – May the Force Be with You and To Hull and Back. He works alongside Roy Slater but does not like him. Slater often makes him miss lunch and watch suspects whilst Slater is away. He has a conversation with Del Boy, in which it is revealed Del Boy sold Terry's mother a gas fire, advising Del to tell Slater who stole a microwave he was accused of stealing. In To Hull and Back, Slater's superiors suspect him of diamond smuggling and order Terry to keep an eye on Slater, with Terry driving Slater into a police sting at the end of the episode.

Jevon
Jevon (Steven Woodcock) is a friend of Rodney and Mickey Pearce, first seen in Dates. Unlike Mickey, Jevon is successful with women, though to his chagrin Cassandra Parry rebuffed him when he asked her to dance. He was even more surprised when she agreed to dance with Rodney. Jevon set up a trading partnership with Mickey Pearce, which lasted throughout the sixth series. They apparently gave up on the trading business at the end of that series though, following a run-in with the Driscoll brothers which left them both in plaster. Jevon made one further appearance in The Jolly Boys' Outing, after which Woodcock left the series to take the role of Clyde Tavernier in EastEnders and the character was not seen again. He appeared in The Jolly Boys' Outing, Little Problems, Sickness & Wealth, Yuppy Love and Dates.

Nerys
"Nervous" Nerys (Andrée Bernard) was the Nag's Head barmaid who appeared in two episodes, Dates and Sickness and Wealth. She briefly dated Rodney, although she was left terrified when a gang of yobs chased them in the van. Nerys was later scared again when she interrupted the séance that the Trotters were attending.

Alan and Pamela Parry
Alan (Denis Lill) and Pamela Parry (Wanda Ventham) made infrequent appearances during series six and seven. They are Cassandra's parents, and subsequently Rodney's in-laws.

Alan is the owner of a successful printing firm, Parry Print Ltd, which employs Rodney for a time from 1989 to 1991, and later becomes a friend of Del Boy. Despite being a successful businessman by the time he met Del, Alan used to live on a council estate in the area, often ending up drunk or getting sick after eating too many jellied eels whilst under Del's influence, much to the chagrin of more overtly middle-class Pam. They are both in attendance at Damien's christening in Miami Twice.

Roy Slater

Detective Chief Inspector Roy Slater (Jim Broadbent in Only Fools and Horses and Calum MacNab in Rock & Chips) appeared in three episodes – May The Force Be With You, To Hull and Back, and The Class of '62. A much-reviled ex-schoolmate of Del's, Slater was a corrupt policeman and (as revealed in The Class of '62) the ex-husband of Raquel Turner. He was sent to prison for diamond smuggling after the events of To Hull and Back. Slater also appears in the prequel Rock & Chips, where he is barely tolerated by Del and the others as a member of their gang, as his friendship with them is at this point obviously falling apart. In Five Gold Rings, he leaves school to become a police cadet, and arrests Del and Jumbo for selling illegal American records (although he is snubbed by his sergeant, who goes on to keep the records for himself and lets Del and Jumbo go with a warning). This is the last time Slater is seen, as he does not appear in The Frog and the Pussycat.

June Snell
June Snell (Diane Langton) is an ex-girlfriend of Del Boy's from many years previously. They meet up again when Rodney dates June's daughter Debbie in Happy Returns, which Del scuppers in the false assumption that Debbie is his daughter.

Del and June fall out when June reveal that Debbie's real father was Del's best friend Albie Littlewood, and Del in turn admits that he had been cheating on her with Albie's girlfriend Deidre. They are later reconciled again, however, as Del invited June to the opera in A Royal Flush with Rodney and his date Lady Victoria. He and June ruin the evening and embarrass Rodney by noisily eating snacks and arguing with other audience members. The evening then comes to an end after June becomes ill from eating too much and vomits (off screen) over an audience member sitting in front of her.

Aside from Debbie, June has another child, a son named Jason.

Barmaids
Throughout the run of Only Fools and Horses, there were various barmaids employed at the Nag's Head. Aside from Nerys, they only filled relatively minor roles, speaking only the occasional one-liner or flirting with Del.
 Joyce (Peta Bernard) appeared in two episodes of the first series.
 Julie (Julie La Rousse) appeared in five episodes between the second and third series; however, La Rousse was credited for only her second appearance.
 Karen (Michele Winstanley) appeared in four episodes of the fourth series. In all her appearances, she was credited as Michèle Winstanley.
 Vicky (Kim Clifford) appeared in the Christmas special To Hull and Back.
 Maureen (Nula Conwell) appeared in five episodes between the fourth and fifth series.

Trotter relatives

Joan Trotter

Joan Mavis Trotter is Del and Rodney's late mother, and wife of Reg. Though she is never seen in the series, she is often mentioned by Del, especially in his attempts to emotionally blackmail Rodney, who had few memories of her. Del loved his mother deeply, and still mourns her death. Over the series, it became clear to Rodney and the viewers, but not always to Del, that Joan had had a series of affairs with numerous men during her loveless marriage to Del's selfish, work-shy father, Reg. One such affair was with local "gentleman thief" Freddie Robdal and resulted in the birth of Rodney. She died on 12 March 1964 (according to The Yellow Peril) of an unknown illness while Rodney was still very young.

Her tombstone, a flamboyant fibreglass monument, is also seen occasionally. In "The Yellow Peril", Del paints it yellow, not realising that the paint is luminous. In Danger UXD, they dress up the blow up dolls in Joan's old clothes in order to get them out of the flat without being noticed. After the Trotters became millionaires, Del returns to their now deserted flat and remembers his mother telling him he could not have the day off school with a hangover because he was due to sit his 11-plus (the actress who provides this voiceover is uncredited). When Cassandra and Rodney have their baby in Sleepless in Peckham, they name her Joan.

The character makes her first screen appearance in Rock & Chips. Portrayed as a hard-working woman in her late 30s, struggling to maintain a home, which included her workshy husband Reg, elderly father-in-law Ted and her teenage son Del Boy. She has an affair with Freddie Robdal, a friend of Reg's recently released from prison, and soon discovers she is pregnant. Joan and Freddie's affair is not one of lust; they seem to love each other genuinely and Joan loves both her boys deeply. She is willing to leave Reg altogether and run away with Freddie to Bournemouth to raise Rodney with him but would only do so once she was sure Del was financially secure. She tries her best to help Del's relationship and hopeful eventual marriage to a rich man's daughter, but the relationship does not work, and Joan ultimately chooses to remain in Peckham for Del's sake. Joan is a huge fan of Hollywood films and actresses, given her job in the Ritz cinema, to the point that she changed her hairstyle multiple times during Rock & Chips to resemble actresses such as Marilyn Monroe, Elizabeth Taylor, Jane Fonda and Audrey Hepburn.

Reg Trotter

Reginald "Reg" Trotter is the estranged father of Del Boy, stepfather of Rodney, and son of Grandad.

Reg abandons his family shortly after the death of his wife Joan, upon which he steals Del's sixteenth birthday cake and Rodney's piggy bank. Eighteen years later he returns, in the episode Thicker than Water, claiming to have a hereditary blood disorder. When the results reveal Del and Rodney to have different blood groups, he attempts to split the family by questioning Del's paternity. He quickly leaves once it becomes known that he has forged the test results himself and is never heard from again. As with their mother, he is often mentioned by Del in other episodes. It was revealed in the final episode Sleepless in Peckham that Rodney is not in fact Reg's biological son, but Freddie Robdal's. It is also shown in Rock & Chips he is an abusive husband to Joan, earning him the hatred of Del and Freddie, and has an affair with Nag's Head barmaid Val.

Vi Trotter

Violet "Vi" Trotter was the estranged, sharp-tongued wife of Ted Trotter, mother of Reg and the paternal grandmother of Del Boy.

Long-dead by Only Fools and Horses, Vi first appeared in the second and third episodes of the prequel Rock & Chips, Five Gold Rings and The Frog and the Pussycat, where she baby-sat the infant Rodney – much to the fury of her husband, who resented her for throwing him out after she had discovered his affair with Alice Ball, Trigger's grandmother. Despite her contempt for her husband, Vi maintained a friendly relationship with her son, grandson and daughter-in-law, and doted on Rodney. Vi mentioned she worked as the charlady for an art dealer, as Del mentioned in Yesterday Never Comes; however, she did not mention that she had stolen a valuable artwork from her employer.

Freddie Robdal

Frederick "Freddie" Robdal, also known by his nickname Freddie the Frog, was an unseen character in the original series. He is first mentioned in The Frog's Legacy and later revealed to be Rodney's biological father. Robdal was a career thief who had been a frogman in the Royal Navy (hence the nickname) and had an extramarital affair with Joan Trotter. Robdal died shortly afterwards, when he accidentally sat on his own detonator during a bank robbery. The Trotters' search for his hidden gold legacy was the focal point of the episode The Frog's Legacy. When an old photograph of Robdal surfaced in the episode Sleepless in Peckham, his striking resemblance to Rodney finally settled the issue of the latter's paternity after years of speculation.

Robdal is one of the main characters in the Only Fools and Horses prequel Rock & Chips, where he is accompanied by explosive expert Gerald "Jelly" Kelly and has a habit of calling people "cocker", among them Del Boy and Boycie. The first episode of Rock & Chips fully reveals the details surrounding Robdal's affair with Joan which resulted in Rodney's birth and establishes the beginning of his uncle-nephew-like relationship with Del, who he accompanies (along with Reg, Grandad, and Del's gang) on their first Jolly Boys' Outing to Margate, although the trip is merely a ruse so that Robdal and Kelly can rob a nearby jewellery store. It is revealed in the second episode, Five Gold Rings, that Robdal did in fact love Joan deeply and wanted to see his son grow up, but it was difficult because of Joan's marriage to Reg and his situations with Del Boy and the police. In The Frog and the Pussycat, Robdal and Kelly are again arrested on suspicion of murdering the sole eyewitness to the Margate robbery, although Robdal discovers it was a fraud by the police. However, Robdal is incarcerated when it is revealed one of the stolen jewels was pawned by Joan, who is "working" as Robdal's charlady (in order to fund Del's film). While in prison, Robdal implores Joan to leave London with him to his seaside home with Rodney. Joan accepts but only once she is certain of Del's financial state. However, Del's planned film does not work out well, and Joan is forced to stay in Peckham. It is implied that Robdal remains in Peckham as well.

Guest and spin-off characters

Tony Angelino
Tony Angelino (Philip Pope) appeared in the episode Stage Fright. By day, he works as a dustman, but by night he is a popular nightclub singer, styled after Tom Jones.
 
When Del Boy is approached by local gangster Eugene McCarthy (Roger Blake) to find a singing act for his mother's eightieth birthday at his own club, the Starlight Rooms, he decides that Raquel and a male partner would make the perfect double act. After acting on a tip from Trigger, he and Rodney visit the Down by the Riverside Club and see Tony performing. Del is impressed and signs himself up as Tony's manager, ignoring Tony's warning that he can only sing certain songs.

On the night of the performance, Tony and Raquel are required to perform "Crying", at which point it is revealed that Tony could only sing certain songs due to his rhoticism, meaning that "crying" sounds like "cwying". Del flees from the club without speaking to Eugene, leaving Tony and Raquel to continue with their musical numbers – "Please Welease Me", "Congwatulations" and "The Gween Gween Gwass of Home", followed by a medley of "wock and woll".

Tony follows Raquel home and demands his money, despite Del claiming that Tony defrauded him by not revealing his rhoticism. However, Eugene calls Del with the news that his mother loved the act, and subsequently offers Tony and Raquel a five-week contract at his club.

Arnie
Arnie (Philip McGough) appears in the episode Chain Gang. A conman, Arnie sells Del Boy, Boycie, Mike, Trigger, Uncle Albert and Rodney a batch of 24 carat gold chains for £12,500, only to later double cross them by faking a heart attack in a restaurant and makes off with both the chains and the money in an ambulance driven by his sons. The group eventually track him down while he is performing the same scam on Denzil, and drive Arnie away in an ambulance of their own.

Solly Attwell
Solly Attwell (Colin Jeavons) appeared in the episode Hole in One. The Trotter family solicitor, believed to have represented Del on other, unspecified, occasions. Solly represented Uncle Albert in his case against the brewery when he fell down the Nag's Head cellar. Solly was described by Rodney as being "more bent than the villains", or according to Del: "an expert". He faced being "defrocked" when it was revealed that Albert had been lying to obtain compensation.

The Driscoll Brothers
Danny and Tony Driscoll (Roy Marsden and Christopher Ryan), usually known as the Driscoll brothers, only appeared in one episode – Little Problems – but were mentioned in numerous others. The Driscoll brothers were the local gangsters with a fearsome reputation for violence (although in order to avoid serious problems with the police, they followed a strict rule in never harming the victim's head). They beat up Del Boy after he failed to repay money owed to them, and in the same episode left Mickey Pearce and Jevon with broken bones for a similar reason. In a similar joke to the different-looking Del and Rodney being brothers, the Driscoll brothers also differ in height, but by a good , though in their case the taller brother has the brains. The pair appear to have a love-hate relationship, as they often argue but continually work together to get what they want.

In the spin-off series The Green Green Grass, it is revealed that the Driscoll brothers have finally been found guilty and sent to prison, thanks to Boycie grassing them to the police, but have been paroled and are now after his blood.

The role of Danny Driscoll was originally written for series fan Anthony Hopkins but he was unable to appear due to the filming of The Silence of the Lambs. Hopkins subsequently recommended his friend Roy Marsden for the role.

Janice
Janice (Gaynor Ward) appears in the episode A Slow Bus to Chingford and is one of Rodney's girlfriends. Whilst Rodney is discussing art, Janice tells him her brother paints for the council. They then get intimate, but Del Boy enters and ruins it. Her last appearance is shortly after this, when Del Boy plays on snide joke on Rodney by telling him his whip and other implements have been washed by Grandad. Astonished and worried, she quietly sneaks out, not giving Rodney enough time tell her that Del is joking, causing Rodney to shout "You rotten git, Del!" for ruining his evening. Del later reveals that he is taking Janice out, but "for Rodney's sake" in order to keep Rodney from getting mad at him. Janice has a Corgi called Nero, which Del gets Rodney to help him patrol the bus garage as a Nocturnal Security Officer, telling Rodney that Nero is an "ex-police dog", the morning after Rodney tells Del that he was up all night taking Nero for walks and that Nero ran away scared when he saw a cat.

Gerald "Jelly" Kelly
Gerald "Jelly" Kelly (Paul Putner) is first mentioned in The Frog's Legacy and later introduced in Rock & Chips, as Freddie Robdal's partner-in-crime and best friend. He accompanies Robdal to Peckham following Robdal's release from prison, but as they are almost out of money, they plan a jewellery robbery while in Margate on a "Jolly Boys Outing" with Del Boy and his family and friends and pull it off while the others are elsewhere. Kelly, however, does not approve of Robdal's relationship with Joan Trotter, whom he refers to as "that slag from the cinema", as both Robdal and Kelly display dislike for the abusive, work-shy Reg. In Five Gold Rings, it is shown that Robdal and Kelly were arrested and imprisoned again for the jewellery robbery, but while they both make bail, Kelly only appears in the episode's opening scene. In The Frog and the Pussycat, Robdal and Kelly are temporarily exonerated but later suspected again following the disappearance of their robbery's sole eyewitness, although Robdal exposes the police's fraud. Though Robdal eventually goes to prison on an alternate charge (to protect Joan, who pawned the ring Robdal gave her in order to buy a Lambretta for Del), Kelly does not, and shares a drink with Robdal once he is freed. In the final scene, he and Robdal rob an art gallery together.

Several years later, Freddie and Kelly break into a post office in Plumstead. Unfortunately, while Kelly sets the explosives and is holding the nitroglycerine, Freddie sits on the detonator and the two men are both killed in the ensuing explosion. In The Frog's Legacy, Rodney sarcastically quips that had Kelly survived, he "wouldn't be any good in a Mexican Wave".

Abdul Khan
Abdul Khan (Tony Anholt) only appeared in one episode; To Hull and Back, where he and Boycie arranged a deal with Del, in order to smuggle diamonds from Amsterdam. Although, this was the only episode in which he appeared, Abdul was also mentioned in Diamonds Are for Heather, when Del tells Heather where he got the engagement ring; Video Nasty, when Del had struck a deal with Abdul's cousin's girlfriend's brother's friend, and in the second Rock & Chips episode Five Gold Rings when Del tells his friends that he got four glass diamond rings from Abdul's father, who owns the Bermondsey Wholesale Jewellery Emporium.

Lady Victoria Marsham-Hales
Lady Victoria "Vicky" Marsham-Hales (Sarah Duncan) is a one-off girlfriend of Rodney's in the 1986 Christmas Special, A Royal Flush. The only daughter of a wealthy and prominent duke, Rodney meets her in the market one day whilst she is (unsuccessfully) trying to sell her artwork. They become close friends and eventually date. Del Boy is immediately interested in Vicky's wealth and breeding and sees Rodney's relationship as a way of making them both millionaires, and despite Rodney's firm protests, repeatedly meddles in the relationship with disastrous results. He finally destroys all chances of Rodney and Vicky being together after inviting himself to dinner at the home of Vicky's father, and getting drunk and obnoxious, insulting the guests and humiliating Rodney. The furious duke throws the Trotters out of his home, and Rodney and Vicky sadly realise that it would be better not to see each other anymore. Unbeknownst to Rodney, Del earlier had told the duke to bribe Rodney with £1,000 to get out of Vicky's life, but a pained Rodney turned it down, angering Del.

Robbie Meadows
Dr Robbie Meadows (Ewan Stewart) appears once in the episode Sickness and Wealth as Del's former GP. When Del goes to visit the doctor due to severe stomach cramps, he discovers that Dr Meadows has left general practice and now works at the local hospital. Del tells his new GP several lies about his lifestyle, claiming that he is a celibate, teetotal, non-smoking, vegetarian "health freak". The GP, unable to ascertain why Del is experiencing such difficulties, sends him to hospital. While Del is worrying about what is wrong with him (fearing he might have Aids), Dr Meadows approaches Del, explaining he was put in charge of Del's case. Knowing Del well, and that he was not the health-conscious man he made himself out to be to the other doctors, Dr Meadows diagnoses Del's illness as IBS.

Jumbo Mills
Jumbo Mills (Nick Stringer in Who Wants to Be a Millionaire and Lee Long in Rock & Chips) was Del's old school friend and business partner (they ran a jellied eels stall together) who emigrated to Australia during the 1960s. Jumbo, named for his love of elephants, returned to Peckham in the episode Who Wants to Be a Millionaire, and offered Del the chance to restore their old partnership by helping him run his new used car business back in Australia, only for Del to refuse the offer due to Rodney being unable to go because of his drug conviction. Stringer also appeared in an earlier episode, Go West Young Man, playing an Australian man who bought a car with no brakes from Del Boy. He later accidentally crashed into the back of an E-type Jaguar, which at the time was being driven by Del, who was looking after it for Boycie.

Vincenzo Occhetti
Vincenzo Occhetti (David Jason) appeared as the main antagonist in the two-part episode Miami Twice. Ochetti was a Mafia don and an exact doppelgänger for Del Boy. As the episode unfolded it emerged that Ochetti was under FBI surveillance and facing trial for murder, kidnapping and drug-running. After seeing Del's resemblance to his father, Occhetti's son Rico launched a series of unsuccessful attempts to assassinate Del, hoping that the authorities would believe Occhetti himself was dead and thus spare him the prison sentence. Every attempt failed, and Del and Rodney eventually uncovered the Mafia plan, providing the FBI with crucial evidence to send Occhetti to prison for life.

Elsie Partridge
Elsie Partridge (Constance Chapman) was Uncle Albert's girlfriend. Although mentioned frequently, she only appears in Sickness and Wealth.

Elsie was a widow with eleven children, and lived on the same estate as the Trotter family. She and Albert met at a bingo game and struck up a romantic relationship, but never married as Albert was still estranged from his wife Ada. Albert often downplayed the nature of their relationship to Del Boy and Rodney, but they knew all about it and often brought Elsie's name up to silence or embarrass him in conversation. Despite his relationship with Elsie, Albert and his friend Knock-Knock had a fight over Marlene's mother, Dora Lane, in He Ain't Heavy, He's My Uncle.

At Albert's insistence, Elsie holds a séance in a private room at The Nag's Head in Sickness and Wealth. Despite voicing their suspicions about her psychic ability, Del and Rodney attend the seance alongside Boycie and Trigger, where Elsie manages to summon Boycie's father and Joan Trotter – the latter of whom demanded that Del get his stomach pains examined at hospital, after Del (who had a fear of doctors) kept avoiding medical intervention. However, it was later revealed that Albert had paid Elsie to pretend that she had summoned Joan's spirit.

By the time Albert dies in If They Could See Us Now, he and Elsie had been living together with Elsie's family in Weston-super-Mare for several years. Del and Rodney, accompanied by Raquel, Cassandra and Damien, travel to attend his funeral but accidentally attend the funeral of Albert "Bunny" Warren – at a church just up the road from Albert's funeral, attended by everyone else from Peckham.

By the time of Strangers on the Shore, Elsie had died.

Miss Tibbs and Miss Gatsby

Abatha Tibbs (Gilly Flower) and Ursula Gatsby (Renee Roberts) are two elderly women that appear in Homesick, individually purchasing items from Del and Rodney.

The characters originated from BBC sitcom Fawlty Towers, which concluded four years before Homesick was aired in 1983. Although not named and credited as "Old Ladies", the BBC's own Radio Times publication credits them as their Fawlty Towers characters.

Reenie Turpin
Reenie Turpin (Joan Sims in The Frog's Legacy and Emma Cook in Rock & Chips) only appeared in The Frog's Legacy but mentioned in Chain Gang. She is Trigger's aunt and Joan Trotter's best friend. She informs Del of the gold legacy that Freddie the Frog left to his mother. She also sparks a debate over who Rodney's real father was after stating that "Joanie was never 100% sure".

In Rock & Chips, Reenie works alongside her best friend, Joan, as an usherette at the local film house. Like Joan and Del, Reenie loathes Reg Trotter and is unafraid to stand up to him, threatening to reveal that Reg is often violent toward his wife. However, the prequel makes no mention of her relationship with Trigger, and she appears to be a mere family friend. She helps Joan determine her pregnancy in an anonymous clinic following her affair with Freddie Robdal and even submits her name for Joan to use while visiting Freddie in prison.

In Del's autobiography, He Who Dares, it is explained that Reenie's brother Donald is Trigger's father.

Unseen characters

Albie Littlewood
Albie Littlewood is an unseen character, mentioned in Happy Returns. He was Del's best friend but had an affair with Del's then-fiancée June Snell, something Del only found out years later. However at the same time Del was having an affair with Albie's girlfriend Deidre. Albie is the father of June's daughter Debbie, whom Rodney had dated. While en route to see June one night, Albie took a shortcut across a railway line and was killed when he fell onto the live rail (the railways in Peckham are electrified using third rails rather than overhead wires).

Albie also appears in the 2010 prequel drama Rock & Chips, played by Jonathan Readwin. In the prequel, he is shown to be (in secret) taking drugs to lighten his mood at certain times, and notably, Albie and Jumbo Mills trick Roy Slater into taking one and later dancing in a bar until he falls from exhaustion.

Monkey Harris, Sunglasses Ron & Paddy the Greek  
Kenneth "Monkey" Harris, Sunglasses Ron and Paddy the Greek are Del Boy's friends who are in the same "business" as him. Although they are mentioned regularly, they are never seen on screen. They are often involved in Del's trading deals (although separately), usually sourcing Del's hooky gear, and are often described and mentioned in discussions between other characters in The Nag's Head.

Writer John Sullivan (known for his attention to detail) gives even the unseen characters a well-rounded back story. For instance, it is known that Monkey Harris lives in a bungalow, as mentioned in the episode No Greater Love. As such, the characters often play a minor role in plot development, usually as a device of comic resolution. According to The Class of '62, Monkey Harris was also a schoolfriend of Del, Boycie, Denzil, Trigger and Roy Slater.

It is possible that Sunglasses Ron is the man sat at the back of the bus in The Jolly Boys' Outing.

References

BBC-related lists
Television characters introduced in 1981
Lists of British sitcom television characters
Only Fools and Horses and Rock & Chips characters